The Nathlaung Kyaung Temple (literally "shrine confining the spirits") is a Hindu temple dedicated to Vishnu. The temple is located inside the city walls of old Bagan, Burma (Coordinates: 21.168965° N, 94.862738° E).

Nathlaung Kyaung Temple is to the west of the Thatbyinnyu Temple, and it is the only remaining Hindu temple in Bagan. Nat-Hlaung Kyaung temple is one of the oldest temples in Bagan, and was built in the 11th century, during the reign of King Anawratha. Some historians believe the temple was built in the 10th century, during the reign of King Nyaung-u Sawrahan (also known as Taungthugyi). The temple was originally built for Hindu Burmese Indians of the 11th century, including merchants and Brahmins in the service of the king. Many structures of the original temple have disappeared, although the main hall remains. Originally, the temple contained statues of the incarnations of Vishnu; however, today, only seven remain. The brick temple was isolated and unrepaired for many years, damaged by earthquakes.

The temple is set on a square template with steep-rising upper terraces. It may have been built by Indian artisans brought into Bagan (Pagan), during the 10th century AD, to work on it and other temples. As the oldest temple in Bagan, its style influenced and inspired the numerous other Buddhist structures that followed. Another legend states that the temple was built to store all the nat from other temples, so that Buddhism could get established in Bagan Kingdom.

See also
Thatbyinnyu Temple – east of Nathlaung Kyaung temple
Ananda Temple – 0.4 miles from Nathlaung Kyaung temple
Bupaya Pagoda – 0.6 miles from Nathlaung Kyaung temple
Dhammayangyi Temple – 0.8 miles from Nathlaung Kyaung temple
Hinduism in Southeast Asia
Hindu temple

Gallery

References

External links
 Nathlaung Kyaung Temple (built c. 931), with images and text by Robert Fiala of Concordia University, Nebraska, USA

 Location map of Nat Hlaung Kyaung Temple Go Historic Maps

Hindu temples in Myanmar
Bagan